The Murray River road and railway bridge is a heritage-listed  railway and former road bridge that carries the Tocumwal railway line across the Murray River at Tocumwal in the Berrigan Shire local government area of New South Wales, Australia. It is also known as the Tocumwal Road and Rail Bridge over Murray River. The property is owned by RailCorp. It was added to the New South Wales State Heritage Register on 2 April 1999.

History 

The Truss lift span bridge over the Murray River opened in 1895, and was constructed by the NSW Public Works Department. It has three spans, the centre span having an opening lift-span for navigation. Initially provided for road traffic only, it was strengthened for rail traffic in 1908, and was used for both road and rail traffic until November 1987. The Edward Hillson Bridge opened on 9 November 1987, located a short distance upstream, the concrete  road bridge carries the Goulburn Valley Highway across the Murray, with the old bridge used for rail traffic only since 1987.

When opened, monthly lifting of the centre span was carried out for testing purposes. When the bridge was made a rail and road bridge, the span was always kept down unless enquired by river traffic. By 1930, river traffic declined, and so by 1944, the monthly lifting was altered to yearly. In 1951, it was proposed to keep the span closed, the last lift for river traffic being in 1933, and no maintenance lifting having been carried out for a decade. In September 1977, both state governments agreed to keep it fixed, and removed requirement for being able to lift it. Easter 1995 celebrations including operation of the lift span.

Description

Heritage listing 
The river bridge was a combined road and rail structure. It is of very high significance because of its technological value and its importance in the history of transport in the State and inter-state rivalries.

Tocumwal road and rail bridge over the Murray River was listed on the New South Wales State Heritage Register on 2 April 1999 having satisfied the following criteria.

The place possesses uncommon, rare or endangered aspects of the cultural or natural history of New South Wales.

This item is assessed as historically rare. This item is assessed as archaeologically rare. This item is assessed as socially rare.

See also 

List of railway bridges in New South Wales
List of bridges in Australia
List of crossings of the Murray River

References

Attribution

External links

 

New South Wales State Heritage Register
Railway bridges in New South Wales
Articles incorporating text from the New South Wales State Heritage Register
Crossings of the Murray River
Railway bridges in Victoria (Australia)
1895 establishments in Australia
Bridges completed in 1895
Vertical lift bridges in Australia
Tocumwal
Borders of Victoria (Australia)
Borders of New South Wales